The 4th Missouri Colored Infantry Regiment was an African-American infantry regiment that served in the Union Army during the American Civil War. Redesignated as the 68th U.S. Colored Troops Regiment on March 11, 1864.

Service
The 4th Missouri Colored Infantry Regiment was organized at Benton Barracks, in St. Louis, Missouri, in the winter of 1863-1864. The regiment's designation was changed to the 68th United States Colored Troops Regiment on March 11, 1864. Attached to District of Memphis, Tennessee, 16th Corps, Dept. of the Tennessee, to June 1864. 1st Colored Brigade, Memphis, Tenn., District of West Tennessee, to December 1864. Fort Pickering, Defenses of Memphis, Tenn., District of West Tennessee, to February 1865. 3rd Brigade, 1st Division, United States Colored Troops, Military Division West Mississippi, to May 1865. 1st Brigade, 1st Division, United States Colored Troops, District of West Florida, to June 1865. Dept. of Texas to February 1866.

Detailed Service
At St. Louis, Mo., till April 27, 1864. Ordered to Memphis, Tenn., and duty in the Defenses of that city till February 1865. Smith's Expedition to Tupelo, Miss., July 5–21, 1864. Camargo's Cross Roads, near Harrisburg, July 13. Tupelo July 14–15. Old Town Creek July 15. At Fort Pickering, Defenses of Memphis, Tenn., till February 1865. Ordered to New Orleans, La., thence to Barrancas, Florida. March from Pensacola, Fla., to Blakely, Ala., March 20-April 1. Siege of Fort Blakely Fort April 1–9. Assault and capture of Fort Blakely April 9. Occupation of Mobile April 12. March to Montgomery April 13–25. Duty there and at Mobile till June. Moved to New Orleans, La., thence to Texas. Duty on the Rio Grande and at various points in Texas till February 1866. Mustered out February 5, 1866.

Commanders
 Colonel Joseph Blackburn Jones
 Lieutenant Colonel Daniel Densmore

See also

List of Missouri Civil War Units
List of United States Colored Troops Civil War units
Missouri in the American Civil War
1st Missouri Regiment of Colored Infantry
2nd Missouri Regiment of Colored Infantry
3rd Missouri Regiment of Colored Infantry
18th U.S. Colored Infantry - Raised "at large" in the State of Missouri
Lincoln University of Missouri

Notes

References
 Dyer, Frederick H. A Compendium of the War of the Rebellion (Des Moines, IA:  Dyer Pub. Co.), 1908.
 
The Civil War Archive
Web site discussing the organization of Missouri "Colored Infantry", including discussions of conditions at Benton Barracks during the winter of 1863-1864. http://www.usgennet.org/usa/mo/county/stlouis/ct.htm
Web site of Historic Blakely State Park: https://web.archive.org/web/20120124030256/http://www.blakeleypark.com/civilwar.asp

Units and formations of the Union Army from Missouri
Missouri Infantry, 004
Military units and formations established in 1863
Military units and formations disestablished in 1866
1863 establishments in Missouri